Jason Haupt is a retired American soccer defender who played professionally in the USISL A-League.

Youth
In 1984, Haupt’s youth club, the Florida Gold Coast won the AAU U-16 national championship.  He attended the University of North Carolina at Greensboro where he played on the men’s soccer team from 1987 to 1990.  In 1987, Haupt and his team mates won the NCAA Division III Men's Soccer Championship.  Haupt was a 1989 and 1990 First Team Division III NCAA All American and finished his career with the school’s career record of seventy-seven goals.  In 2001, UNCG inducted Haupt into its Athletic Hall of Fame.

Professional
In 1993, Haupt signed with the Greensboro Dynamo where he would remain for his professional career.  In 1993, the Dynamo won the USISL championship and Haupt was All League  In May 1994, Haupt had a season ending knee injury.  He returned in 1996.  In 1997, the Dynamo finished as runner up to the Milwaukee Rampage the championship  The team went on hiatus in 1998, but when they resumed play in 1999, Haupt rejoined them, finishing his career in 2000.

References

Living people
American soccer players
North Carolina Fusion U23 players
UNC Greensboro Spartans men's soccer players
USISL players
USL Second Division players
USISL Select League players
A-League (1995–2004) players
Association football forwards
Association football midfielders
Year of birth missing (living people)